Tenisha Renee Yancey (born August 29, 1976) formerly served as a Democratic member of the Michigan House of Representatives, where she represented the 1st House District. The 1st House District previously comprised the cities of Harper Woods, Grosse Pointe Woods, Grosse Pointe Shores and a portion of Detroit. 

Yancey was elected in the 2017 Special Election called to fill a vacancy created when former Representative Brian Banks resigned from the seat after being charged with fraud for using false payroll records to obtain a loan from a credit union.

Personal life
Yancey is the niece of former United Auto Workers Vice President, Jimmy Settles.

Yancey worked for the Wayne County Executive's office and the Wayne County Land Bank prior to receiving her Juris Doctor degree in 2012. After passing the Michigan Bar in May 2014, Yancey joined the Wayne County Prosecutor's office; where she worked until her employment ended in April 2017.

Criminal history
Yancey's criminal history began in the mid-1990s, around the time she turned eighteen (18). Over an eighteen (18) month period, Yancey was charged with stalking, felonious use of a firearm, vandalism and trying to use her car to harm Latasha Steele and twice convicted of retail fraud, once in Kalamazoo and again in Battle Creek for shoplifting items from stores and trying to return them for cash. Yancey also spent a couple months in various county jails.

When Fox 2 Detroit interviewed Yancey about her criminal history, Yancey dismissed her legal troubles, attributing them to being caught up in a "love triangle." Yancey subsequently moved to southwestern Michigan, where court records in Kalamazoo and Battle Creek show she was twice convicted of stealing items from stores and trying to return the items for cash. Approximately six (6) months later, Yancey returned to Detroit, and was charged with stalking Steele and firing a gun into the home of Steele's mother.

Yancey denied firing a gun into the home of Steele's mother, stating "[t]hat's a lie, yes." Yancey also claimed, "I did not strike her car at all. That was just the finding of the court." Asked if the judge had ruled incorrectly, Yancey stated. "[h]e got it wrong based on the fact that I didn't strike her car." "Absolutely."

When Yancey's victim saw the Fox 2 news story about Yancey, she contacted Pulitzer Prize- and Emmy Award-winning investigative reporter M.L. Elrick, to give her version of events. Steele stated "[w]hen I saw the FOX 2 interview that she did, I was livid . . . I was so upset that I felt the need to speak up." When asked about the incident in question, Steele stated "I saw her pull up, I saw her with my own eyes, me." "I saw her. She didn't ever park. You know how you come inside on the street. She stayed in the middle of the street in the car and fired from the car and just took off." Steele said that she didn't see anybody else in the car.

Steele also had a vastly different account of the second incident, approximately six (6) months later, which resulted in Yancey being charged with felony malicious destruction of property and assault with a dangerous weapon charges. "I and my cousin were inside the car and we were at a stop sign and at first she was riding on the side of us trying to get us to come out of the car," Steele said. ". . . that's when we came to the stop sign and she hit us so hard from the back, she pushed us out into traffic." Steele's cousin, Tanesha Allen, confirmed Steele's account of the incident. Records show that Yancey pleaded guilty to stalking in August 1995 and served two (2) years' probation. Later in 1997, Yancey was found guilty for failing to stop at the scene of a property damage accident by the same Wayne County court and sentenced to one (1) year of probation. 

Yancey has also been a regular in 36th District Court for most of her adult life, mainly as a parking scofflaw — she currently owes $323 in unpaid fines.

Civil Litigation

2022 Michigan Court of Claims Lawsuit
On May 3, 2022, Leigh Reed-Pratt filed a lawsuit in the Michigan Court of Claims, seeking to get Yancey thrown off the 2022 Primary Election ballot for campaign finance violations and for violating residency requirements. Candidates who file to run for public office in Michigan file an Affidavit of Identity which, among other things, attests under penalty of perjury that the candidate doesn't owe any campaign statements, reports, late filing fees or fines In 2022, election officials and judges disqualified multiple candidates after determining that they still owed reports or fines. Reed-Pratt's lawsuit asserted that Yancey should be bounced, too, claiming that Yancey's failure to respond to queries from the Secretary of State amounted to overdue campaign paperwork.

Specifically, Yancey failed to explain how expenditures on "style consulting" in Birmingham, "hair consulting" in Detroit, dry cleaning in Grosse Pointe Woods and car repairs in Lansing demonstrated "an identifiable, tangible benefit that advances the candidate's nomination or election" in 2019, approximately (1) year prior to her election. A Secretary of State campaign finance analyst noted: "The expenditures ... do not appear to advance the nomination or election of candidate Yancey for the office of state representative." Leigh-Pratt's lawsuit also asserted that Yancey was not eligible to run for office in Detroit, because according to Yancey's Principal Residence Exemption ("PRE") application, Yancey lived in Harper Woods. Under Michigan law, homeowners are entitled to a significant property tax break on their home, also known as their principal residence.

To qualify for a PRE, the applicant must own the home, and the home must be where the applicant lives. On May 4, 2022, one (1) day after Reed-Pratt filed her lawsuit, Yancey transferred ownership of her home to her son Jaylen. Approximately one (1) week later, Yancey filed paperwork to rescind her PRE. Yancey then presented Harper Woods officials with a Quit Claim Deed transferring ownership of her home to herself and her son Jaylen. 

That same day Jaylen filed an application for a PRE on the home.  However, during an investigation, Yancey's neighbors told Elrick that Jaylen isn't living in the home either. Neighbors also told Elrick that they saw strangers coming and going from the residence, because Yancey used the property as an Air BnB. Airbnb rates Yancey as a "Superhost," which means she has received high ratings and rented her home at least ten (10) times over the past year, or for 100 nights over at least three (3) bookings.

Based on reviews posted on Airbnb, Yancey has rented her "primary residence" out at least six (6) times between March and October of this year. When Elrick checked for availability of Yancey's residence on Air BnB, he noted that the rental company stated: "This is a rare find. Tenisha's place on Airbnb is usually fully booked." In October 2022, Elrick booked the property, to confirm that Yancey's "primary residence" was being used as an investment property. Yancey accepted Elrick's reservation, sending a note that said: "Hello! Thanks for booking."

Political career

Legislative achievements
As of 2018, Yancey has only filed two (2) pieces of legislation. Neither have been heard in Committee.

2016 General Election
Tenisha Yancey was elected to the Harper Woods School Board on November 8, 2016. Yancey had no children attending school in the Harper Woods School District, but cited her experience in the court system as making her qualified to serve on the Board.

2017 Special Primary Election
Although still serving her first term on the Harper Woods School Board, Yancey ran in the August 8, 2017, Special Election Primary against Harper Woods attorney Pamela Sossi. Despite Sossi being regarded as the front runner, Yancey was able to defeat Sossi by 198 votes; Yancey received 32.9 percent of the vote (2215 votes) to Sossi's 30 percent (2017 votes). Sossi, a Harper Woods resident, won the vote in Grosse Pointe Woods, Grosse Pointe Shores and Harper Woods, while Yancey took the Detroit vote.

Yancey ran with the strategic and financial support of her childhood friend, Brian Banks. After her Primary victory, Yancey credited Banks with playing a big role in her campaign. Brian Banks made personal visits in the District to convince his still-loyal constituents to vote for Yancey. "He volunteered a lot," Yancey said of Banks. Without him, "I think it would have been more difficult -- lot more difficult."

Yancey was also the benefactor of significant support from Detroit Mayor, Mike Duggan. Asked why he supported Yancey over Sossi, a former employee of the Mayor's Father, Judge Patrick Duggan, Mayor Duggan stated Yancey "is committed to supporting my initiative to reduce car insurance rates for Detroiters, whereas Pam Sossi was in the pocket of the medical providers and unscrupulous attorneys who are ripping off our residents." Despite her promise to Mayor Duggan, Yancey voted against his "D-Insurance" legislation.

Less than two (2) weeks before the Primary Election, Grosse Pointe Democratic Club board member Kirkland Garey sent a letter to Wayne County Prosecutor Kym Worthy, Wayne County Sheriff Benny Napoleon and the media, urging Worthy and Napoleon to rescind their support for Yancey because of her criminal record.

2017 Special General Election
In the November 8, 2017, Special Election General, Yancey received 7,266 votes, or 71% of the vote.

2022 Primary Election
On April 19, 2022, Yancey filed to run for Judge of the 3rd Circuit Court, joining a field of twenty seven (27) other candidates vying for fifteen (15) seats on the bench. On April 19, 2022, Yancey also filed to run for Judge of the 36th District Court, joining one (1) other candidate vying for two (2) seats on the bench. On April 22, 2022, Yancey abandoned her candidacy for Judge of the 3rd Circuit Court.

Electoral history

See also
Michigan House of Representatives
Michigan Democratic Party

External links

Campaign Finance
Voting Records

References 

1976 births
Living people
21st-century American politicians
Politicians from Detroit
African-American women in politics
African-American state legislators in Michigan
Democratic Party members of the Michigan House of Representatives
Eastern Michigan University alumni
University of Detroit Mercy alumni
Women state legislators in Michigan
21st-century American women politicians
21st-century African-American women
21st-century African-American politicians
20th-century African-American people
20th-century African-American women